Langdon Place is a home rule-class city in Jefferson County, Kentucky, United States. The population was 936 as of the 2010 census.

Geography
Langdon Place is located in northeastern Jefferson County at  (38.285246, -85.584417). It is bordered to the north by Murray Hill, at its eastern corner by Meadow Vale, to the southeast by Rolling Hills, to the south by Westwood, to the southwest by Plantation, and otherwise by consolidated Louisville/Jefferson County.

Westport Road forms the southern boundary of the city, and Goose Creek Road forms the northeast boundary.

Demographics

As of the census of 2000, there were 974 people, 350 households, and 277 families residing in the city. The racial makeup of the city was 84.70% White, 8.21% African American, 0.31% Native American, 4.62% Asian, and 2.16% from two or more races. Hispanic or Latino of any race were 1.13% of the population.

There were 350 households, out of which 42.9% had children under the age of 18 living with them, 68.6% were married couples living together, 7.1% had a female householder with no husband present, and 20.6% were non-families. 16.9% of all households were made up of individuals, and 2.3% had someone living alone who was 65 years of age or older. The average household size was 2.78 and the average family size was 3.17.

In the city, the population was spread out, with 28.1% under the age of 18, 7.7% from 18 to 24, 27.1% from 25 to 44, 30.3% from 45 to 64, and 6.8% who were 65 years of age or older. The median age was 38 years. For every 100 females, there were 94.4 males. For every 100 females age 18 and over, there were 99.4 males.

The median income for a household in the city was $67,167, and the median income for a family was $72,813. Males had a median income of $54,861 versus $32,434 for females. The per capita income for the city was $29,231. None of the families and 0.8% of the population were living below the poverty line, including no under eighteens and 3.3% of those over 64.

References

External links
City of Langdon Place official website

Cities in Jefferson County, Kentucky
Cities in Kentucky
Populated places established in 1977
1977 establishments in Kentucky